is a train station on the Kyoto Municipal Subway Karasuma Line in Fushimi-ku, Kyoto, Japan.

Lines

  (Station Number: K14)

Layout
The station has one island platform serving two tracks.

History
The station opened on June 11, 1988.

References

Railway stations in Japan opened in 1988
Railway stations in Kyoto Prefecture